Frank Putnam Flint (1862–1929) was a U.S. Senator from California from 1905 to 1911. Senator Flint may also refer to

Dutee Wilcox Flint (1882–1961), Rhode Island State Senate
Edwin Flint (1814–1891), Wisconsin State Senate
Rockwell J. Flint (1842–1933), Wisconsin State Senate
Waldo Flint (1820–1900), Wisconsin State Senate
Wilson G. Flint (died 1867), California State Senate